The 2010 Alberta Scotties Tournament of Hearts was the 2010 edition of the Alberta provincial women's curling championship. It was held January 6-10 at the Calgary Curling Club in Calgary, Alberta. The winning team represented Alberta at the 2010 Scotties Tournament of Hearts in Sault Ste. Marie, Ontario.

Teams

Draw Brackets

A Event

B Event

C Event

Playoffs

A vs. B
January 9, 8:30pm

C1 vs. C2
January 9, 8:30pm

Semi-final
January 10, 9:30am

Final
January 10, 2:00pm

References

External links
Official site

Alberta
Sport in Calgary
Curling in Alberta
Scotties Tournament of Hearts
Alberta Scotties Tournament of Hearts